Emanuel School is a private, co-educational day school in Battersea, south-west London. The school was founded in 1594 by Anne Sackville, Lady Dacre and Queen Elizabeth I and occupies a 12-acre (4.9 ha) site close to Clapham Junction railway station.

The school is part of the Headmasters' and Headmistresses' Conference and at the start of the 2017–18 academic year had 907 pupils between the ages of ten and eighteen, paying fees of £17,997 per year. It teaches the GCSE and A-Level syllabuses.

History
Emanuel School is one of five schools administered by the United Westminster Schools' Foundation. It came into being by the will of Anne, Lady Dacre, dated 1594. She was the daughter of Sir Richard Sackville by his wife Winifred, a daughter of Sir John Bruges (otherwise Brydges), Lord Mayor of London in 1520-21. Her brother was Thomas Sackville, 1st Earl of Dorset. She married Gregory Fiennes of Herstmonceaux and Chelsea, 10th Baron Dacre, in November 1558. He died on 25 September 1594 and she followed him, dying on 14 May (buried 15 May) 1595.

Her epitaph states:

Faeminei lux clara chori, pia, casta, pudica, aegis subsidium, pauperibusque decus.

Dacre wrote that one of the main aims of the foundation should be "for the bringing up of children in virtue and good and laudable arts so that they might better live in time to come by their honest labour." With Dacre's benefaction in 1594, Emanuel Hospital (almshouses and school), as it was first called, began. The children wore long brown tunics, rather similar in cut to those still worn by pupils at Christ's Hospital. Thanks to the interest of Queen Elizabeth I, cousin to Dacre, a charter was drawn up, and the school and almshouses were established on a site at Tothill Fields, Westminster. Mention is made of the hospital and similar foundations in an undated letter written by Daniel Defoe, entitled A Scheme for a Royal Palace in the Place of White-Hall.

In 1883, the school sought larger, newer buildings for the children, and the boy boarders, as they all then were, moved to the present buildings on the edge of Wandsworth Common. These had been established originally in the late 1850s as Royal Victoria Patriotic School for Boys, funded by the Royal Patriotic Fund, for children orphaned during the Crimean War; the building was designed by Henry Saxon Snell.

Headmasters and headmistresses 

A. Towsey, 1883–1894
 A. Chilton, 1894–1905
 H. Buchanan-Riley, 1905–1913
 S. Goodwin, 1914–1927
 G. H. Wyatt (acting), 1927–1928
 C. M. Broom, 1928–1953
 J. B. Grundy, 1953–1963
 W. S. Hipkins (acting), 1964
 C. C. Kuper, 1964–1975
 P. Hendry, 1975–1984
 P. F. Thomson, 1984–1994
 Tristram Jones-Parry, 1994–1998
 Anne-Marie Sutcliffe, 1998–2004
 Mark Hanley-Browne, 2004–2017
 Robert Milne, 2017–

Chaplains 
Emanuel is an Anglican foundation with the chapel situated in the main building above the library. Daily chapel services are led by the chaplain with regular Holy Communion services and musical concerts. Confirmation is available with the chaplain who holds regular confirmation classes for pupils, whilst the chapel is open for the use of pupils, teachers, staff and parents every day. Paintings of Moses and Aaron that formed part of the altarpiece of St. Benet Fink are now held in chapel.

Clapham Junction rail crash 

On 12 December 1988, pupils and teachers were first on the scene of the Clapham Junction rail crash, which happened adjacent to the school. They were later commended for their service by Prime Minister Margaret Thatcher, and the pupils received an "Outstanding Endeavour" award from the BBC Television children's programme, Blue Peter. The school was used as a casualty centre.

Sport
The school has a rowing club called the Emanuel School Boat Club.

Notable Old Emanuels

References

External links

Old Emanuels
Headmasters' and Headmistresses' Conference
Millbury Drawings & Prints

1594 establishments in England
Educational institutions established in the 1590s
Private co-educational schools in London
Private schools in the London Borough of Wandsworth
Member schools of the Headmasters' and Headmistresses' Conference